Michel Roux (22 July 1929 in Colombes, Hauts-de-Seine - 2 February 2007 in Paris) was a French actor.

He was also the French voice for many American and Italian actors, such as Jack Lemmon, Peter Sellers, Alec Guinness and Tony Curtis.

The main part of this actor's work was in theatre.

Roux died of cardiac arrest at the age of 77 on February 2, 2007, in Paris.

Filmography

Videography

 1950 : Alec Guinness dans Noblesse oblige
 1950 : Edgar Buchanan dans La porte du diable
 1952 : Ben Gazzara dans Autopsie d'un meurtre
 1954 : Adrian Hoven dans Les jeunes années d'une Reine
 1954 : John Forsythe dans Fort Bravo
 1954 : Keenan Wynn dans L'escadrille Panthère
 1954 : Robert Francis dans Ouragan sur le Caine, The Caine Mutiny
 1955 : Alec Guinness dans Le cygne
 1955 : Cliff Robertson dans Picnic
 1956 : Bing Crosby dans Haute Société
 1956 : Claus Biederstaedt dans Feu d'artifice
 1956 : Dan Dailey dans Viva Las Vegas
 1957 : Alberto Sordi dans Le médecin et le sorcier
 1957 : Jack Lemmon dans Cowboy
 1957 : Jack Lemmon dans L'Enfer des tropiques
 1957 : John van Dreelen dans Le temps d'aimer et le temps de mourir
 1957 : Leopoldo Trieste dans L'adieu aux armes
 1957 : Montgomery Clift dans Le bal des maudits
 1957 : Peter Graves dans L'admirable Crichton
 1957 : Wim Sonneveld dans La Belle de Moscou
 1958 : Alec Guinness dans Le bouc-émissaire
 1958 : Bradford Dillman dans Le génie du mal
 1958 : Robert Buzz Henry dans La vallée de la poudre
 1958 : Henry Silva dans Les bravados
 1958 : Paul Hubschmid dans Le Tigre du Bengale
 1958 : Peter Myers dans Qu'est ce que maman comprend à l'amour ?
 1958 : Stuart Whitman dans Le Bruit et la fureur
 1958 : Stuart Whitman dans Duel dans la boue
 1958 : Tibério Murgia dans Le Pigeon
 1959 : Cary Grant dans La Mort aux trousses
 1959 : Maxwell Shaw dans Chérie, recommençons
 1959 : Renato Salvatori dans Hold-up à la milanaise
 1960 : Alan Young dans La machine à voyager dans le Temps
 1960 : Alexander Scourby dans Les sept voleurs
 1960 : Channing Pollock dans Il était trois flibustiers
 1960 : Cornel Wilde dans Le secret du grand Canyon
 1960 : Elvis Presley dans G.I. Blues
 1960 : Elvis Presley dans Les rodeurs de la plaine
 1960 : John Saxon dans Les cavaliers de l'Enfer
 1960 : Lee Montague dans Scotland Yard contre X
 1960 : Sammy Davis Jr. dans L'Inconnu de Las Vegas
 1960 : Sanford Meisner dans Tendre est la nuit
 1960 : Tony Randall dans Les aventuriers du fleuve
 1960 : Tony Randall dans Le Milliardaire
 1961 : Jim Hutton dans L'américaine et l'amour
 1961 : John Saxon dans Mr. Hobbs prend des vacances
 1962 : Bob Newhart dans L'Enfer est pour les héros
 1962 : Jerry Van Dyke dans Il faut marier papa
 1962 : Pierre Brice dans Le trésor du lac d'argent
 1962 : Stuart Whitman dans Le jour le plus long
 1962 : Tony Randall dans Garçonnière pour 4
 1962 : Will Hutchins dans Les maraudeurs attaquent
 1963 : Adolfo Marsillach dans La tulipe noire
 1963 : Elvis Presley dans L'idole d'Accapulco
 1963 : Frank Sinatra dans Deux Têtes folles
 1963 : Peter Sellers dans La panthère rose
 1963 : Richard Wattis dans Hôtel international
 1964 : Adolfo Marsillach dans Le repas des fauves
 1964 : Audie Murphy dans La fureur des Apaches
 1964 : Dick Van Dyke dans Mary Poppins
 1964 : Peter Sellers dans On n'y joue qu'à deux
 1964 : Peter Sellers dans Quand l'inspecteur s'en mèle
 1964 : Ray Walston dans Embrasse-moi idiot
 1964 : Stuart Whitman dans Ces merveilleux fous volants et leurs drôles de machines
 1964 : Stuart Whitman dans Rio Couchos
 1964 : Walter Matthau dans Mirage
 1965 : Frank Sinatra dans L'Express du colonel von Ryan
 1965 : Glyn Houston dans Le secret de l'île sanglante
 1965 : Jack Lemmon dans Comment tuer votre femme
 1965 : Terence Stamp dans L'obsédé
 1965 : Tony Curtis dans Boeing Boeing
 1965 : Tony Curtis dans Une vierge sur canapé
 1965 : Tony Randall dans A.B.C. contre Hercule Poirot
 1965 : Warren Stevens dans Planète interdite
 1966 : Alec Guinness dans Paradisio, Hôtel du libre-échange
 1966 : Charlie Callas dans Jerry la grande gueule
 1966 : Dom DeLuise dans La blonde défie le FBI
 1966 : Jerry Lewis dans Tiens bon la rampe Jerry
 1966 : Michael Caine dans Alfie le dragueur
 1966 : Peter Sellers dans Le renard s'évade à 3 heures
 1967 : Peter Sellers dans Casino Royale
 1968 : Jack Lemmon dans Un drôle de couple
 1968 : Peter Sellers dans La Party
 1968 : Robert Culp dans Bob et Carole, Ted et Alice
 1968 : Vittorio Gassman dans Douze plus u]
 1969 : Jack Nicholson dans Easy Rider
 1969 : Michael Caine dans L'or se barre
 1970 : Gian Maria Volonté dans Enquête sur un citoyen au-dessus de tout soupçon
 1970 : Tony Curtis dans Les baroudeurs
 1971 : Kirk Douglas dans Les doigts croisés
 1972 : Duilio del Prete dans Alfredo, Alfredo
 1972 : Jack Lemmon dans Avanti!
 1972 : Vittorio Gassman dans Parlons femmes
 1975 : Ian Bannen dans La Chevauchée sauvage
 1975 : Nino Manfredi dans Nous nous sommes tant aimés
 1975 : Peter Sellers dans Le retour de la panthère rose
 1976 : Peter Sellers dans Quand la panthère rose s'emmèle
 1976 : Peter Sellers dans Un cadavre au déssert
 1978 : Peter Sellers dans La malédiction de la panthère rose
 1979 : Tony Curtis dans Deux affreux sur le sable
 1980 : Dabney Coleman dans Comment se débarrasser de son patron ?
 1980 : Tony Curtis dans Le miroir se brisa

Theatre
 L'Azalée
 
 Monsieur chasse
 Je l'aimais trop
 1998 : Face à face, written by Francis Joffo, with Popeck and Jean-Pierre Castaldi
 Bon week-end monsieur Bennett
 Max et Charly
 Face à face
 Faut-il tuer le clown?
 Le charlatan
 Un suédois ou rien
 Le canard à l'orange
 Tromper n'est pas joué
 La cage aux folles
 Le dîner de cons
 Féfé de Broadway
 Monsieur Masure
 Domino de Marcel Achard avec Jean Piat, Danièle Lebrun et Guy Mottet

References

1929 births
2007 deaths
People from Colombes
French male film actors
French male voice actors